Samuel Escue Tillman (October 2, 1847 – June 24, 1942) was an astronomer, engineer, military educator, and career officer in the United States Army who spent 30 years teaching at the United States Military Academy at West Point, New York. In addition to writing for periodicals on a wide range of subjects and authoring several influential textbooks on chemistry and geology, in 1917 Tillman was recalled from previous mandatory retirement to serve as superintendent of the United States Military Academy for the duration of conflict which became known as World War I.

Early life
Samuel Tillman was born in Bedford County, Tennessee, near modern Shelbyville on October 2, 1847, one of several sons of Lewis Tillman and his wife Mary C. Davidson Tillman. The younger Tillman and his brothers were raised on the family plantation in wartime Tennessee during much of the American Civil War. Tillman left the farm in 1864 to attend Miami University in Oxford, Ohio, but left after a year to accept an at-large appointment to the United States Military Academy in July, 1865, months after the end of the rebellion.

Military career
Tillman proved an excellent cadet, graduating 3rd out of 39 in the USMA graduating class of 1869. Tillman spent fifteen months on the frontier at Fort Riley, Kansas, then returned to the academy for a period as assistant professor of mathematics. Originally commissioned as an artillery officer, he transferred to the Army Corps of Engineers on June 10, 1872. The following years would see Tillman alternating tours between teaching assignments at the academy and surveying the last unexplored portions of the American West. In addition to involvement in expeditions to explore and map parts of the western states of Arizona, California, Idaho, Montana, Nevada, New Mexico, and Utah, Tillman was detailed for a year as assistant astronomer on the national expedition to Northern Tasmania observe the Transit of Venus. In late 1878, Tillman became the sixtieth of the founding members of Washington, D.C.'s Cosmos Club, but resigned in 1881, after he was given permanent assignment at West Point as professor of chemistry, mineralogy, and geology.<ref name=Cosmos337>Cosmos Club, p. 337</ref>

Lieutenant Tillman sat on the board of inquiry concerning the alleged assault by cadets on Johnson Chesnut Whittaker. As full professor Tillman was given responsibility for redesigning the physical science curriculum at the academy; U.S. Army Adjutant General Richard C. Drum ordered Tillman and fellow academy instructor George L. Andrews to visit Harvard, Yale, and other American institutions of higher learning to investigate new educational technologies in order to incorporate them into the curriculum.

The next thirty years of Tillman's life were devoted to writing and teaching at the academy. He wrote for popular periodicals like Popular Science and Cosmopolitan and literary journals like American Monthly Review of Reviews. Tillman authored several science textbooks for use by academy instructors, notably the physics work Elementary Lessons in Heat (1889), Descriptive General Chemistry (1897), and A text-book of Important Minerals and Rocks (1900). He was responsible for the academy's mineralogical and geological cabinet. Tillman also wrote a series of memoirs which have been featured in the works of Miami University historian Dwight L. Smith.
Smith, ed., The Kansas Frontier, 1869-1870: Lt. Samuel Tillman's First Tour of Duty

Toward the end of his career, Tillman was presented with an honorary degree from Yale University in 1906. In 1911, after 44 years of active U.S. Army service in the classroom and field, Tillman was retired. He spent some time in Italy, leaving at the outbreak of World War I; Tillman settled in Princeton, New Jersey, continuing to write, presenting A Review of West Point's History'' before the New York Historical Society in October, 1915.

In early 1917, shortly before the American entry into World War I, the army was preparing for its involvement in the war raging in Europe on the Western Front, and all academy instructors who could be detailed were assigned to field commands. This left an understrength USMA teaching staff not only doing "double duty," but also teaching in officer training schools during the summer. When Colonel Tillman was recalled from retirement to serve as USMA superintendent in June, 1917, the cadet class of 1917 had already graduated two months early and been assigned to wartime posts. The USMA class of 1918 graduated in the Autumn of 1917, the classes of 1919 and 1920 graduated in June 1918, and the cadet class of 1921 were graduated before the Armistice with Germany was signed. "On November 2, 1918, the Corps of Cadets consisted of members of the Fourth Class only." Tillman had seen the graduation of an entire corps of cadets before he was again retired, this time with promotion to brigadier general and the Army Distinguished Service Medal for his wartime service. The citation for his Army DSM reads:

While Superintendent of West Point, Tillman refused repeated requests to add military aviation to the curriculum.

Legacy
Samuel Escue Tillman died June 24, 1942 at the home of his daughter, Katherine Tillman Martin, in Southampton, New York and was buried at West Point Cemetery two days later. According to his obituary, he was survived by one brother, A.H. Tillman, who served for a time as United States district attorney in Washington D.C. Four brothers had preceded him in death, among them James Davidson Tillman, who had served as a Confederate colonel and postwar as U.S. Minister to Ecuador.

In 1885, when Henry Tureman Allen was exploring the Copper River in the new U.S. territory of Alaska, he named a discovered peak after Tillman, his academy professor, but the discovery proved to be one major error in the survey, Allen mistaking either Mount Wrangell or Mount Sanford for the non-existent Mount Tillman.

In 2008, Kent Biffle of the Dallas Morning News reported receiving newspaper clippings from a local lawyer and historian on the subject of UFO sightings in Stephenville, Texas. Apparently in 1897, widespread newspaper reports of a cigar-shaped flying object started to circulate in the Midwest and Southwest. Responding to sightings previously reported in the Morning News, on April 17, 1897, one respected Erath County farmer, C.L. McIlhany discovered such a craft had landed on his property, and reported two human operators, a pilot and an engineer, who gave their names as "S.E. Tilman" and "A.E. Dolbear." The two operators performed minor repairs on their electrically powered lighter-than-air craft, then again flew away.

Selected works by Tillman

References

1847 births
1942 deaths
People from Bedford County, Tennessee
Miami University alumni
United States Military Academy alumni
Military personnel from Tennessee
United States Military Academy faculty
United States Army Corps of Engineers personnel
People from West Point, New York
American science writers
Superintendents of the United States Military Academy
United States Army personnel of World War I
United States Army generals
Burials at West Point Cemetery